Kalininaul (Tätli-Bulak) is a rural locality (a selo) in Arslanbekovsky Selsoviet, Nogaysky District, Republic of Dagestan, Russia. The population was 535 as of 2010. There are 8 streets.

Geography 
Kalininaul is located 11 km east of Terekli-Mekteb (the district's administrative centre) by road and sourh from Leninaul. Leninaul and Terekli-Mekteb are the nearest rural localities.

Nationalities 
Nogais live there.

References 

Rural localities in Nogaysky District, Dagestan